The Valley Hotel is a historic building that was constructed in Staunton, Virginia built around 1815. 

The Valley Hotel is located on Augusta Street across the street from a Baptist church (shown in picture). After it was a hotel, the building became a center for the African-American community.  As of 2007, it housed a clock shop.

References 

Hotels in Virginia
Buildings and structures in Staunton, Virginia
Hotels established in 1815
1815 establishments in Virginia